John Wilbur Stealey Sr. is an American game developer and publisher who founded MicroProse with Sid Meier. He also founded (in 1995) and is the current CEO of iEntertainment Network.

Business career
Stealey took a job with General Instrument as their Director of Strategic Planning for their Systems and Service Division in Hunt Valley, Maryland. There he met Sid Meier and co-founded his first game company, MicroProse Software. As CEO he grew the company to over $43 million in annual sales, taking MicroProse Software public in 1991, and selling in 1993 to a Kleiner Perkins company, Spectrum HoloByte. He resigned from the company following the merger.

Stealey started the game software company Interactive Magic in 1995, took it public in 1998, and sold to a private equity firm in 1999.
While running iEntertainment Network, Stealey mentioned in a 1996 interview that he owned his own military training aircraft and flew it for recreation on a regular basis.

Personal life
Stealey graduated from the United States Air Force Academy in 1970 and was, at the time he co-founded Microprose, a Major in the USAF Reserve and instructor for the Pennsylvania Air National Guard, flying A-37 attack aircraft. He retired from the military with the rank of Lt Col.

Stealey owned the Baltimore Spirit of the National Professional Soccer League from the franchise's inception in 1992 until he sold it to Edwin F. Hale, Sr. in 1998.

Next Generation listed Stealey in their "75 Most Important People in the Games Industry of 1995" for his roles as former head of MicroProse and then-current head of Interactive Magic. Stealey left the company in 1999, but later returned as CEO in 2002.

References

External links
LinkedIn Profile
 

1947 births
American video game designers
Living people
MicroProse people
United States Air Force Academy alumni
Baltimore Blast